Zuri Tibby (born September 1, 1995) is an American model from Florida. She was discovered in a shopping mall at the age of 15. It was announced on August 24, 2016, that Tibby would become the first black model to be a spokesmodel for Victoria's Secret PINK.

Tibby also appeared in the PINK segment in the Victoria's Secret Fashion Show 2016 and the next year in the Victoria's Secret Fashion Show 2017.

References

1995 births
Living people
American female models
African-American female models
Female models from Florida
IMG Models models
21st-century African-American people
21st-century African-American women